Lukas Foss (August 15, 1922 – February 1, 2009) was a German-American composer, pianist, and conductor.

Career 
Born Lukas Fuchs in Berlin, Germany in 1922, Foss was soon recognized as a child prodigy. He began piano and theory lessons with Julius Goldstein [Herford] in Berlin at the age of six. His parents were Hilde (Schindler) and the philosopher and scholar Martin Foss. He moved with his family to Paris in 1933, where he studied piano with Lazare Lévy, composition with Noël Gallon, orchestration with Felix Wolfes, and flute with Marcel Moyse. In 1937 he moved with his parents and brother to the United States, where his father (on advice from the Quakers who had taken the family in upon arrival in Philadelphia) changed the family name to Foss.  He studied at the Curtis Institute of Music in Philadelphia, with Isabelle Vengerova (piano), Rosario Scalero (composition) and Fritz Reiner (conducting).

At Curtis, Foss began a lifelong friendship with classmate Leonard Bernstein, who later described Foss as an "authentic genius."  In 1961 Bernstein conducted the premiere of Foss's Time Cycle, while Foss would conduct the premiere of Bernstein's Symphonic Dances from West Side Story.

Foss also studied with Serge Koussevitzky during the summers from 1939 to 1943 at the Berkshire Music Center (now known as the Tanglewood Music Center) and, as a special student, composition with Paul Hindemith at Yale University from 1939 to 1940. He became an American citizen in 1942.

Foss was appointed professor of music at UCLA in 1953, replacing Arnold Schoenberg. While there he founded the Improvisation Chamber Ensemble, which made its Boston debut in 1962 for the Peabody Mason Concert series. He founded the Center of the Creative and Performing Arts in 1963 while at the State University of New York at Buffalo.

Over six separate years from 1961 to 1987, Foss was the music director of the Ojai Music Festival. From 1963 to 1970 he was music director of the Buffalo Philharmonic Orchestra.  From 1971 to 1988 he was music director of the Brooklyn Philharmonic (formerly Brooklyn Philharmonia).  From 1981 to 1986, he was conductor of the Milwaukee Symphony Orchestra. He was a professor of music, theory, and composition at Boston University beginning in 1991. His notable students include Faye-Ellen Silverman, Claire Polin and Rocco Di Pietro.

Foss is grouped in the "Boston school" along with Arthur Berger, Irving Fine, Alexei Haieff, Harold Shapero, and Claudio Spies. He was a National Patron of Delta Omicron, an international professional music fraternity. In 2000 he was awarded a Gold Medal by the American Academy of Arts and Letters.

Compositions

Notable students

Personal life 
In 1951 Foss married Cornelia Brendel, an artist and painter who was born in Berlin in 1931, the daughter of art historian Otto Brendel and Maria Weigert Brendel. The couple had two children, Christopher Brendel Foss, who became a documentary filmmaker and corporate consultant on social and environmental engagement/sustainability communications, and Eliza Foss Topol, an actress. Foss and his wife were separated for almost five years from 1968 to 1972, during which Cornelia was the lover of pianist Glenn Gould and moved with the two children to Toronto, an arrangement that she later called, "a perfect triangle".

Foss, who had Parkinson's disease in his final years, died at his home in Manhattan on February 1, 2009, aged 86, of a heart attack.

References

External links 
 Lukas Foss' page at Carl Fischer
 [ Allmusic: Lukas Foss]
 Humanities Web: Lukas Foss Index 
 CDeMusic: Lukas Foss
 New Albion Artists: Lukas Foss
 
 Art of the States: Lukas Foss
Lucas Foss Collection at the Library of Congress

Interviews
 Lukas Foss interview by Gabrielle Zuckerman, from American Mavericks site
 Lukas Foss interview by Terry Gross, from Fresh Air program, originally broadcast October 7, 1987
 Interview with Lukas Foss by Bruce Duffie, February 2, 1987

1922 births
2009 deaths
20th-century classical composers
20th-century American composers
20th-century German composers
20th-century American conductors (music)
20th-century American male musicians
21st-century classical composers
21st-century American composers
21st-century German composers
21st-century American male musicians
American male classical composers
American classical composers
American male conductors (music)
Ballet composers
Contemporary classical music performers
German classical composers
German male classical composers
German conductors (music)
German male conductors (music)
Jewish emigrants from Nazi Germany to the United States
Jewish American classical composers
Music & Arts artists
Musicians from Berlin
Curtis Institute of Music alumni
Tanglewood Music Center faculty
University at Buffalo alumni
Yale University alumni
Pupils of Fritz Reiner
Pupils of Paul Hindemith
Pupils of Rosario Scalero
20th-century American Jews
21st-century American Jews
Fulbright alumni